Eupithecia zibellinata is a moth in the family Geometridae. It is found in Russia (Amur) and Japan.

References

Moths described in 1880
zibellinata
Moths of Japan
Moths of Asia